Lady's Bluff Small Wild Area (also known as Ladyfinger Bluff Small Wild Area) is a small public access nature preserve managed by the Tennessee Valley Authority located along the Tennessee River in Perry County, Tennessee. A trail leads from a parking area to an overlook atop a high bluff on the river. The preserve is home to numerous native plant and wildlife species, and is noted for the large number of old-growth cedar trees and limestone outcrops in the area.

References

External links
 TVA Small Wild Areas

Protected areas of Perry County, Tennessee
Tennessee River